The Vaillant's strange agama, shield-tail agama or turnip-tail agama (Xenagama batillifera), is a species of lizard in the family Agamidae. The species is endemic to the Horn of Africa.

Geographic range 
X. batillifera is limited to northwestern Somalia and east Ethiopia.

Reproduction 
X. batillifera is oviparous.

References 

Xenagama
Reptiles described in 1882
Taxa named by Léon Vaillant
Reptiles of Somalia
Reptiles of Ethiopia